Eprint may refer to:
 Eprint, a digital version of a research document
 EPrints, an Open source software for archiving research documents
 HP ePrint, a set of cloud printing technologies
 Preprint, an electronic copy of a research document before its formal publication